Guarianthe, abbreviated Gur. in the horticultural trade, is a small genus of epiphytic orchids, growing in wet forests in Mexico, Central America, Colombia, Venezuela and Trinidad. It was separated from the bifoliate Cattleyas in 2003, based on phylogenetic studies of nuclear DNA sequence data.

Species

Natural hybrid 
Guarianthe × laelioides (Lem.) Van den Berg 2015  = Gur. aurantiaca × Gur. skinneri – Chiapas, Belize, Guatemala, Honduras, Nicaragua

References 

  (1809) Nouveau Bulletin des Sciences, publié par la Société Philomatique de Paris 1: 318.
  (2009) Epidendroideae (Part two). Genera Orchidacearum 5: 71 ff. Oxford University Press.

External links 

 
Laeliinae genera
Epiphytic orchids